Bernard Conlan (24 October 1923 – 12 December 2013) was a British Labour Party politician.

Conlan was educated in Manchester and became an engineer, and an official of the Amalgamated Engineering Union from 1942. He served as a councillor on Manchester City Council from 1954.

Conlan contested High Peak in 1959.
He was Member of Parliament for Gateshead East from 1964 until he retired in 1987.  His successor was Joyce Quin.

Conlan died 12 December 2013.

References

General sources
The Times Guide to the House of Commons, Times Newspapers Ltd, 1966, 1983 & 1987

1923 births
2013 deaths
Amalgamated Engineering Union-sponsored MPs
Labour Party (UK) MPs for English constituencies
British people of Irish descent
Councillors in Manchester
British trade unionists
UK MPs 1964–1966
UK MPs 1966–1970
UK MPs 1970–1974
UK MPs 1974
UK MPs 1974–1979
UK MPs 1979–1983
UK MPs 1983–1987
20th-century British businesspeople